Miller Grove High School is a public high school in Stonecrest, Georgia, near Lithonia. It is part of the DeKalb County School District.

Academics 
The school's Advanced Placement offerings include chemistry, English language, English literature, physics, psychology, U.S. history, and World History: Modern.

Demographics 
The demographic breakdown of the 1,317 students enrolled in the 2018–2019 school year was:
 American Indian/Alaska Native — 1
 Asian — 9
 Black — 1,256
 Hispanic — 28
 White — 4
 Two or More Races — 19

"Only at miller grove" meme 

In March 2020, an image of a student reading a book on a staircase with the caption "Only at miller grove" was posted on Instagram, and became a viral meme on social media, particularly TikTok, Twitter, Snapchat, and Instagram.

References

External links 
 

DeKalb County School District high schools
Stonecrest, Georgia